Lucas dos Santos Lopes (born 16 February 1998) is a Brazilian footballer who plays as a forward.

Career statistics

Club

References

1998 births
Living people
Brazilian footballers
Brazilian expatriate footballers
Association football forwards
Liga Portugal 2 players
Sport Club São Paulo players
Grêmio Esportivo Anápolis players
União Esporte Clube players
Leixões S.C. players
Brazilian expatriate sportspeople in Portugal
Expatriate footballers in Portugal